Alphonse Yanghat (4 May 1947 – 18 April 2018) was a track and field sprinter from the Republic of the Congo. He set a personal best of 10.4 seconds for the 100 metres in 1972 and gained selection to compete at the 1972 Munich Olympics.

At the Olympics he finished seventh in his heat (second last ahead of Liberia's Andrew Sartee). Having represented his country at the age of fifteen, he became the youngest ever Olympic competitor for the Republic of Congo. He is also the youngest runner ever to compete in the men's 100 metres at the Olympics.

References

1947 births
2018 deaths
Republic of the Congo male sprinters
Olympic athletes of the Republic of the Congo
Athletes (track and field) at the 1972 Summer Olympics